Atkaracalar District is a district of the Çankırı Province of Turkey. Its seat is the town of Atkaracalar. Its area is 234 km2, and its population is 4,968 (2021).

Composition
There are two municipalities in Atkaracalar District:
 Atkaracalar
 Çardaklı

There are 8 villages in Atkaracalar District:

 Budakpınar
 Demirli
 Eyüpözü
 Hüyükköy
 Kızılibrik
 Kükürt
 Susuz
 Yakalı

References

Districts of Çankırı Province